Elachista skulei is a moth of the family Elachistidae. It is found in Greece.

References

skulei
Moths described in 1998
Moths of Europe